The Church of St Petka is a late Medieval Bulgarian church in the village of Vukovo, Kyustendil Province.

Location, history, architectural and artistic features 

The church is situated on the left bank of the Struma River in the eastern part of the village of Vukovo, municipality of Boboshevo.

The church has one nave and one apse without a narthex, and with pilasters forming a shallow arch on the western facade. The vault is semi-cylindrical. The semicircular apse has a small, narrow window. It was built of stones and white plaster. The whole interior as well as the western external wall are painted. The frescoes in the church are relatively well preserved and are an important testimony to the development of late medieval painting in Bulgaria and the Balkans. The church was constructed in the 16th century.

The frescoes were painted in 1598, as noted in the ktitor inscription in the western side of the nave, and were paid for through donations from wealthy villagers. The frescoes feature traditional medallions with depictions of Jesus Christ on the vault, friezes of medallions with saints and prophets and full-length portraits of saints under the arcade. Among the images of saints and martyrs is one of the oldest known depictions of Saint Sava and depictions of the sainted Pope Sylvester I and St Boniface, who are popular in Catholic art. There are a number of details with influence from Italian art – the moustaches of some of the soldiers, faces in profile in the Betrayal of Judas, the knight's banner on the lance of the centurion St. Longinus in the Crucifixion and others. With its new ideas and skilfully painted frescoes, the church is among the most valuable monuments from that period in the Balkans.

The church is an architectural monument of culture (DV, is.77/1972) and an artistic monument of culture with national importance (DV, is.100/1969).

The church is named after Saint Paraskeva or Petka of Bulgaria who lived in the 10th century. From 1238 her relics were kept in the capital of the Bulgarian Empire, Tarnovo, but after the fall of the country under Ottoman domination, the relics were finally moved to Iaşi in modern Romania in 1641.

Gallery

Literature 

 
 
 
 
 
 
 
 
 
 
 
 
 
  (Studia Slavico-Byzantina et Mediaevalia Europensia, X).

External links 

 Паметници на културата в Община Бобошево
 Църквата "Света Петка" - фотоалбум № 1
 Църквата "Света Петка" - фотоалбум № 2 
 Църквата "Света Петка" - фотоалбум № 3
 Житие на Света Петка Българска

Churches in Kyustendil Province
Medieval Bulgarian Orthodox church buildings